Tartesa is an Australasian realm genus of butterflies in the family Lycaenidae.

Species
Tartesa astarte  (Butler, 1882) 
Tartesa ugiensis  (Druce, 1891)

References

Polyommatini
Lycaenidae genera